Zhou Youguang (13 January 1906 – 14 January 2017), also known as Chou Yu-kuang or Chou Yao-ping, was a Chinese economist, banker, linguist, sinologist, Esperantist, publisher, and supercentenarian, known as the "father of Pinyin", a system for the writing of Mandarin Chinese in Roman script, or romanization, which was officially adopted by the government of the People's Republic of China in 1958, the International Organization for Standardization (ISO) in 1982, and the United Nations in 1986.

Early life and career 

Zhou was born Zhou Yaoping in Changzhou (Changchow), Jiangsu Province, on 13 January 1906 to a Qing Dynasty official. At the age of ten, he and his family moved to Suzhou, Jiangsu Province. In 1918, he entered Changzhou High School, during which time he first took an interest in linguistics. He graduated in 1923 with honors.

Zhou enrolled that same year in St. John's University, Shanghai where he majored in economics and took supplementary coursework in linguistics. He was almost unable to attend due to his family's poverty, but friends and relatives raised 200 yuan for the admission fee, and also helped him pay for tuition. He left during the May Thirtieth Movement of 1925 and transferred to Guanghua University, from which he graduated in 1927.

On 30 April 1933, Zhou married Zhang Yunhe (张允和). The couple went to Japan for Zhou's studies. Zhou started as an exchange student at the University of Tokyo, later transferring to Kyoto University due to his admiration of the Japanese Marxist economist Hajime Kawakami, who was a professor there at the time. Kawakami's arrest for joining the outlawed Japanese Communist Party in January 1933 meant that Zhou could not be his student. Zhou's son, Zhou Xiaoping (周晓平), was born in 1934. The couple also had a daughter, Zhou Xiaohe.

In 1937, due to the outbreak of the Second Sino-Japanese War, Zhou and his family moved to the wartime capital Chongqing, and his daughter died. He worked for  Sin Hua Bank before entering public service as a deputy director at the National Government's Ministry of Economic Affairs, agricultural policy bureau. After the 1945 Japanese defeat in World War II, Zhou went back to work for Sin Hua where he was stationed overseas: first in New York City and then in London. When he was in New York, he met Albert Einstein twice while visiting friends at Princeton University.

Zhou participated for a time in the China Democratic National Construction Association.  After the founding of the People's Republic was established in 1949 he returned to Shanghai, where he taught economics at Fudan University for several years.

Designing Pinyin 

Because of his friendship with Zhou Enlai who recalled the economist's fascination with linguistics and Esperanto, he summoned Zhou to Beijing in 1955 and tasked his team with developing a new alphabet for China. The Chinese government placed Zhou at the head of a committee to reform the Chinese language to increase literacy. 

While other committees oversaw the tasks of promulgating Mandarin Chinese as the national language and creating simplified Chinese characters, Zhou's committee was charged with developing a romanization to represent the pronunciation of Chinese characters. Zhou said the task took about three years, and was a full-time job. Pinyin was made the official romanization in 1958, although (as now) it was only a pronunciation guide, not a substitute writing system. Zhou's team based Pinyin on several preexisting systems: the phonemes were inspired by Gwoyeu Romatzyh of 1928 and Latinxua Sin Wenz of 1931, while the diacritic markings representing tones were inspired by zhuyin.

In April 1979, the International Organization for Standardization (ISO) in Warsaw held a technology conference. Speaking on behalf of the People's Republic of China, Zhou proposed the use of the "Hanyu Pinyin System" as the international standard for the romanization of Chinese. Following a vote in 1982 the scheme became ISO 7098.

In the modern era Pinyin has largely replaced older romanization systems such as Wade-Giles.

Later activities 

During the Cultural Revolution, Zhou was sent to live in the countryside and to be "reeducated", as were many other intellectuals at that time. He spent two years at a labor camp.

After 1980, Zhou worked with Liu Zunqi and Chien Wei-zang on translating the Encyclopædia Britannica into Chinese, earning him the nickname "Encyclopedia Zhou". Zhou continued writing and publishing after the creation of Pinyin; for example, his book 中国语文的时代演进 (Zhōngguó yǔwén de shídài yǎnjìn), translated into English by Zhang Liqing, was published in 2003 as The Historical Evolution of Chinese Languages and Scripts. Beyond the age of 100, he published ten books, some of which have been banned in China.

In 2011, during an interview with NPR, Zhou said that he hoped to see the day China changed its position on the Tiananmen Square killings in 1989, an event he said had ruined Deng Xiaoping's reputation as a reformer. He became an advocate of political reform and democracy in China, and was critical of the Communist Party of China's attacks on traditional Chinese culture when it came into power.

In early 2013, both Zhou and his son were interviewed by Dr. Adeline Yen Mah at their residence in Beijing. Mah documented the visit in a video and presented Zhou with a Pinyin game she created for the iPad. Zhou became a supercentenarian on 13 January 2016 when he reached the age of 110.

Zhou died on 14 January 2017 at his home in Beijing, one day after his 111th birthday; no cause was given. His wife had died in 2002, and his son had died in 2015.

Google honored what would have been his 112th birthday with an animated version of its logo in Mandarin.

Books

Zhou was the author of more than 40 books, some of them banned in China and over 10 of them published after he turned 100 in 2005.

Gallery

See also 
 Yuen Ren Chao
 List of centenarians (educators, school administrators, social scientists and linguists)

References

Further reading

External links 

 Centenarian scholar Zhou Youguang's blog (百岁学人周有光的博客) 

1906 births
2017 deaths
20th-century Chinese translators
21st-century Chinese translators
Chinese bankers
Chinese expatriates in Japan
Chinese expatriates in the United States
Chinese supercentenarians
Creators of writing systems
Educators from Changzhou
Academic staff of Fudan University
Linguists from China
Men supercentenarians
Academic staff of Peking University
People's Republic of China translators
Academic staff of Renmin University of China
Romanization of Chinese
Pinyin
St. John's University, Shanghai alumni
Scientists from Changzhou
Academic staff of Shanghai University of Finance and Economics
Chinese sinologists
Victims of the Cultural Revolution
Writers from Changzhou
20th-century Chinese inventors
Businesspeople from Changzhou